Anžela Brice (born 21 March 1970) is a Latvian biathlete. She competed at the 2002 Winter Olympics and the 2006 Winter Olympics. She also competed in the cross-country skiing at the 1998 Winter Olympics.

References

External links
 

1970 births
Living people
Cross-country skiers at the 1998 Winter Olympics
Biathletes at the 2002 Winter Olympics
Biathletes at the 2006 Winter Olympics
Latvian female biathletes
Latvian female cross-country skiers
Olympic biathletes of Latvia
Olympic cross-country skiers of Latvia
Place of birth missing (living people)
21st-century Latvian women